Look What I Almost Stepped In... is the eighth studio album by the southern California punk rock band The Vandals, released in 2000 by Nitro Records. It was recorded in April 2000. It was the band's final album for Nitro, as they moved to their own label Kung Fu Records the following year.

Composition
Much of the album is characterized by the pop-punk music and humorous lyrics for which the band is known.

Although regular Vandals drummer Josh Freese is credited as a band member and appears in band photos in the album's liner notes, he was unavailable to play on the album due to other musical commitments. The band therefore called on regular substitute Brooks Wackerman, who had filled in for Freese on several occasions as a touring drummer. Wackerman himself is an accomplished drummer who would join Bad Religion the following year. The album also features guest appearances by Dexter Holland of The Offspring (who also co-wrote "Jackass"), Jack Black and Kyle Gass of Tenacious D, musician/actor/screenwriter Scott Aukerman, and members of the New Jersey band Bigwig.

Release
Look What I Almost Stepped In... was released in August 2000. In October, the band embarked on a tour of the UK, with support from the Ataris and Bigwig. Between June and August 2001, the group performed on the Warped Tour. Later in the month, the band played three shows in the UK as part of the Extreme 2001 festival.

Track listing

Personnel
Dave Quackenbush - vocals
Warren Fitzgerald - guitar, backing vocals
Joe Escalante - bass, backing vocals
Brooks Wackerman - drums
Jack Black - backing vocals on "Fourteen"
Kyle Gass - backing vocals on "Fourteen"
Scott Aukerman - backing vocals on "That's My Girl"
Dexter Holland - backing vocals on "Jackass"
Bigwig - gang vocals

Album information
Record label: Nitro Records
Recorded at Grand Master Studios in Hollywood, California
Produced by Warren Fitzgerald
Engineered by:
Bradley Cook at Grand Master Studios in Hollywood with assistance from Andrew Alekel
Chris Sheldon at Westlake Studios in Hollywood with assistance from Jason Rankins
Eddy Schreyer at Oasis Mastering in Studio City, California
John Tyree (assistant engineer) at Ocean Way in Hollywood
Mixed by Chris Sheldon at Westlake Studios in Hollywood
Mastered at Oasis Mastering in Studio City
All songs copyright 2000 by Puppety Frenchman Music, SEAC
Cover art by Shag
Art direction by Kris Martinez
Band photo by Lisa Johnson
Additional artwork by Mickey Stern

References

2000 albums
Nitro Records albums
The Vandals albums